The Producers Guild of America Award for Best Episodic Drama, also known as the Norman Felton Award for Outstanding Producer of Episodic Television, Drama, is an annual award given by the Producers Guild of America since 2000.

Previous PGA television awards
Prior to 2000, the award for outstanding producer of episodic television was not split into drama and comedy. Out of the eleven honored television programs, seven were episodic dramas:
 1991: Northern Exposure (CBS)
 1992: I'll Fly Away (NBC)
 1993: NYPD Blue (ABC)
 1994: ER (NBC)
 1996: Law & Order (NBC)
 1998: The Practice (ABC)
 1999: The Sopranos (HBO)

Winners and nominees

2000s

2010s

2020s

Total awards by network
 HBO – 8
 AMC – 5
 ABC – 2
 NBC – 2
 Netflix – 2
 FOX – 1
 FX – 1
 Hulu – 1
 Showtime – 1

Total nominations by network
 HBO – 30
 AMC – 16
 Netflix – 14
 ABC – 13
 NBC – 10
 Showtime – 8
 FOX – 6
 CBS – 5
 FX – 3
 Hulu – 3
 PBS – 3
 Apple TV+ – 2
 Disney+ – 2
 Paramount Network – 1

Eligibility Calendar Per Year 
2nd. January 1990 to December 1990

3rd. January 1991 to December 1991

4th. January 1992 to December 1992

5th. January 1993 to December 1993

6th. January 1994 to December 1994

7th. January 1995 to December 1995

8th. January 1996 to December 1996

9th. January 1997 to December 1997

10th. January 1998 to December 1998

11th. January 1999 to December 1999

12th. January 2000 to December 2000

13th. January 2001 to December 2001

14th. January 2002 to December 2002

15th. January 2003 to December 2003

16th. January 2004 to August 2004

17th. September 2004 to August 2005

18th. September 2005 to May 2006

19th. June 2006 to May 2007

20th. June 2007 to May 2008

21st. June 2008 to May 2009

22nd. June 2009 to May 2010

23rd. June 2010 to May 2011

24th. June 2011 to May 2012

25th. June 2012 to May 2013

26th. June 2013 to May 2014

27th. June 2014 to May 2015

28th. June 2015 to December 2016

29th. January 2017 to December 2017

30th. January 2018 to December 2018

31st. January 2019 to December 2019

32nd. January 2020 to December 2020

33rd. January 2021 to December 2021

34th. January 2022 to December 2022

Programs with multiple awards
3 awards
 Mad Men (consecutive)
 The Sopranos

2 awards
 Breaking Bad (consecutive)
 Succession
 The West Wing (consecutive)

Programs with multiple nominations

8 nominations
 Game of Thrones

6 nominations
 Lost
 Mad Men
 The Sopranos

5 nominations
 Better Call Saul
 Breaking Bad
 Dexter
 Six Feet Under
 The West Wing

4 nominations
 24
 CSI: Crime Scene Investigation
 House of Cards

3 nominations
 The Crown
 Downton Abbey
 Grey's Anatomy
 The Handmaid's Tale
 Homeland
 Ozark

2 nominations
 Big Little Lies
 Boston Legal
 House
 Law & Order
 Stranger Things
 Succession
 True Blood

References

Episodic Drama